In December 2006, the Sri Lanka Army (SLA) launched multi-pronged attacks in an attempt to capture territory in Vaharai and the Trincomalee District held by the Liberation Tigers of Tamil Eelam (LTTE).

Timeline 
At least 40 civilians were killed during the Sri Lankan bombardment.

References 

Battles of the Eastern Theater of Eelam War IV
Conflicts in 2006
2006 in Sri Lanka
December 2006 events in Asia